Lengauer a surname. Notable people with the surname include:

Anton Lengauer-Stockner (born 1961), Austrian biathlete
Natalia Lengauer (1908–1997), Ukrainian ambulance doctor
Thomas Lengauer (born 1952), German computer scientist and computational biologis

See also 
Lengauer-Tarjan's algorithm